"Gelem, Gelem" is a song composed by Žarko Jovanović, often used as the anthem of the Romani people. The title has been adapted in many countries by local Roma to match their native orthography and spoken dialect of the Romani language. Some of the song's many titles include
 "Đelem, Đelem" (Croatian and Latin Serbian and Bosnian orthography)
 "Djelem, Djelem" (German and French orthography)
 "Dzelem, Dzelem"
 "Dželem, Dželem" (alternative Croatian and Latin Serbian and Bosnian orthography)
 "Gyelem, Gyelem" (Hungarian orthography)
 "Jelem, Jelem"
 "Opré Roma" 
 "Romale Shavale"
 "Ѓелем, Ѓелем" (Macedonian orthography)
 "Джелем, джелем" (Russian, Ukrainian and Bulgarian orthography)
 "Ђелем, Ђелем" (Cyrillic Serbian and Bosnian orthography)
 "Џелем, Џелем" (alternative Cyrillic Serbian and Bosnian orthography)
 "Kara Çocuk Raksı" (Turkish version, lit. black child dance)
In an interview with reporter Mike Kalezić, Jovanović himself titled the song "Opre Roma". 

After experiencing firsthand the incarceration of Roma during the Porajmos (the Romani Holocaust of World War II), Jovanović later composed the lyrics of "Gelem, Gelem" and set them to a traditional melody in 1949. The song was first adopted by delegates of the first World Romani Congress held in 1971.

Lyrics

Original

Translation

I went, I went on long roads
I met happy Roma 
O Roma, where do you come from, 
With tents happy on the road?

O Roma, O Romani youths!

I once had a great family, 
The Black Legion murdered them
Come with me, Roma from all the world 
For the Roma, roads have opened
Now is the time, rise up Roma now, 
We will rise high if we act 

O Roma, O Romani youths!

Open, God, White doors
So I can see where are my people.   
Come back to tour the roads
And walk with happy Roma

O Roma, O Romani youths!

Up, Romani people! Now is the time
Come with me, Roma from all the world   
Dark face and dark eyes,   
I want them like dark grapes

O Roma, O Romani youths!

Alternate lyrics 
There are many versions of "Gelem, Gelem", notably those translated by Ronald Lee.

In 2004, the band Vaya Con Dios released an interpretation, with lyrics in French by their singer Dani Klein, with the similar sounding title "Je l'aime, Je l'aime".

References

Sources
 Patrin Web Journal - Gelem, Gelem: Roma Anthem

See also 
 Romani nationalism

External links 

 Kosovo Roma Oral History Project - Roma Culture: Music

Romani music
Anthems